Christian Josiah Olave (born June 27, 2000) is an American football wide receiver for the New Orleans Saints of the National Football League (NFL). He played college football at Ohio State, where he holds the school record of most career touchdown receptions at 35. Olave was drafted by the Saints in the first round of the 2022 NFL Draft.

Early life and high school career
Of Cuban descent on his father's side and African-American on his mother's, Olave was born on June 27, 2000, in San Ysidro, California. He played football at Eastlake High School in Chula Vista for two seasons before transferring to Mission Hills High School in San Marcos, California. He had to sit out his junior year due to California Interscholastic Federation transfer rules. During his senior season, Olave caught 93 passes for 1,764 yards and 26 touchdowns. He was also a member of the school's basketball and track teams. He committed to Ohio State University in January 2018.

College career
As a freshman at Ohio State, Olave played on both offense and special teams. He recorded 12 catches for 197 yards and three touchdowns during his debut season. During the 2018 match up against Michigan, he was able to bring in two touchdowns and block a punt in the 62–39 Ohio State win. The following week in the 2018 Big Ten Football Championship Game, he caught five passes for 79 yards and a touchdown against Northwestern. 

In the 2019 season, Olave had three games with two receiving touchdowns. His highest yard total came against Rutgers with four receptions for 139 receiving yards in the 56–21 victory. He finished with 48 receptions for 840 receiving yards and 12 receiving touchdowns.

In the 2020 season, Olave played in seven games due to the COVID-19 pandemic shortening the Buckeyes' season. He scored multiple receiving touchdowns in three games and went over 100 receiving yards in five games.

Olave recorded four games with multiple receiving touchdowns and five going over the 100-yard mark in the 2021 season. Olave finished the 2021 season with 65 receptions for 936 receiving yards and 13 receiving touchdowns. His 13 receiving touchdowns led the Big Ten. Following the season, Olave announced that he would be opting out of the 2022 Rose Bowl in order to prepare for the 2022 NFL Draft.

Professional career

Olave was drafted by the New Orleans Saints in the first round (11th overall) of the 2022 NFL Draft.

Olave made his NFL debut in Week 1 against the Atlanta Falcons with three receptions for 41 yards and a two-point conversion in the 27–26 victory. In Week 3, against the Carolina Panthers, Olave had nine receptions for 147 yards. In Week 4, against the Minnesota Vikings, he had his first professional touchdown reception on a four-yard reception from Andy Dalton. He added two more games going over the 100-yard mark over the 2022 season. He finished his rookie season with 72 receptions for 1,042 receiving yards and four receiving touchdowns. He was named to the 2022 PFWA All-Rookie Team.

References

External links
 

 New Orleans Saints bio
Ohio State Buckeyes bio
College statistics at Sports-Reference.com

2000 births
Living people
People from San Marcos, California
Sportspeople from San Diego County, California
Players of American football from California
American football wide receivers
Ohio State Buckeyes football players
All-American college football players
New Orleans Saints players
American sportspeople of Mexican descent